William Roche (February 11, 1842 – October 19, 1925) was a Canadian politician and merchant.

Born in Halifax, Nova Scotia, he was the son of William Roche and Susan Manning and was educated at the Halifax Academy and the Free Church Academy. Roche married Clara MacLean of Pictou. He served as an alderman for Halifax from 1849 to 1850. Roche was Vice-President of the Union Bank of Canada and President of the Halifax Fire Insurance Company. Roche served as a member of the Legislative Assembly of Nova Scotia from 1886 to 1897. From 1896 to 1897, he was a Minister Without Portfolio and Member of the Executive Council. He was elected to the House of Commons of Canada for the electoral district of Halifax in the 1900 federal election. A Liberal, he was re-elected in 1904 and was defeated in 1908. He was summoned to the Senate of Canada on the advice of Wilfrid Laurier representing the senatorial division of Halifax, Nova Scotia in 1910. He served until his death in 1925.

His uncle Charles Roche served in the Nova Scotia assembly.

Electoral results

References

1842 births
1925 deaths
Canadian senators from Nova Scotia
Liberal Party of Canada MPs
Liberal Party of Canada senators
Members of the House of Commons of Canada from Nova Scotia
Nova Scotia Liberal Party MLAs